Phil Hay (born 7 February 1938) is a former Australian rules footballer who played for Hawthorn in the VFL during the 1960s.

Hay played in a variety of positions at the start of his career and was the 19th man in Hawthorn's 1961 premiership side, their first. When Les Kaine left the club at the end of the 1962 season, Hay took his place at fullback. It was there that he played his best football and finished equal second in the 1964 Brownlow Medal count.

Phil is one of three brothers that played at  older brother Bill and younger brother Sted

External links

1938 births
Hawthorn Football Club players
Hawthorn Football Club Premiership players
Australian rules footballers from Victoria (Australia)
Living people
One-time VFL/AFL Premiership players